Amnon Krauz (אמנון קראו; born August 10, 1952) is an Israeli former Olympic swimmer. He was born in Petah Tikva, Israel.

Swimming career
Krauz competed for Israel at the 1968 Summer Olympics in Mexico City, Mexico, at the age of 16. In the Men's 100 metre Freestyle he came in 6th in Heat 9 with a time of 57.2, and in the Men's 200 metre Freestyle he came in 5th in Heat 2 with a time of 2:09.3.

References

External links
 

1952 births
Living people
Swimmers at the 1968 Summer Olympics
Olympic swimmers of Israel
Israeli male swimmers
Sportspeople from Petah Tikva